The Bryan Station Stakes is a Grade III American Thoroughbred horse race for three-year-olds over a distance of one mile on the turf held annually in October at Keeneland Race Course, Lexington, Kentucky during the autumn meeting. It currently offers a purse of $300,000.

History

The Bryan Station Stakes is named after an early fortified settlement known as Bryan Station in Lexington, Kentucky. It was located on present-day Bryan Station Road, about three miles northeast of New Circle Road, on the southern bank of Elkhorn Creek near Briar Hill Road.

The event was inaugurated on 15 April 1993 as a race for fillies and mares that were four-years-old or older over a distance of one and one-sixteenth miles on the dirt track and was won by Peter S. Willmott's Gray Cashmere starting at 6/1 in a time of 1:44.44 flat by  a length. The following year the event was scheduled in the autumn October meeting and held on the turf with conditions of event modified to fillies and mares that were three-years-old or older.

The event was shortened to a mile in 1995 and the winner Very Special Lite set a new track record of 1:33.

In 2002 the conditions of entry into the event were changed to only allow three-year-olds and the event was rename to the Storm Cat Stakes. Storm Cat was the leading sire in North America in 1999 and 2000.

In 2005 Keeneland reverted the name of event back to the Bryan Station Stakes.
The event's classification was upgraded to Grade III status in 2008.

After 2010 the event was only scheduled in 2015 and it lost its classification status.

The event has been regularly scheduled since 2020 and in 2022 the event regained its Grade III status.

Records
Speed  record
 1 mile: 1:33:60   – Very Special Lite  (1995)

Margins
 6 lengths – Mingling Glances (1998)

Most wins
 2 – Mingling Glances (1998, 1999)

Most wins by a jockey
 3 – Javier Castellano (2009, 2015, 2020)

Most wins by a trainer
 3 – Burk Kessinger Jr.  (1998, 1999 twice)

Most wins by an owner
 2 – Bruce Barton & Alvin D. Haynes (1998, 1999)

Winners

Legend:

 
 

Notes:

† In the 2008 running of the event Seaspeak was first past the finishing post but was disqualified for interference in the stretch run. Cowboy Cal was declared the official winner of the event and Seaspeak was placed second.

See also 
 List of American and Canadian Graded races

External links 
 2021 Keeneland Media Guide

References

1993 establishments in Kentucky
Keeneland horse races
Flat horse races for three-year-olds
Turf races in the United States
Graded stakes races in the United States
Grade 3 stakes races in the United States
Recurring sporting events established in 1993